International affairs may refer to:

 Diplomacy
 International relations
 International Affairs Association
 International Affairs (journal), a peer-reviewed academic journal first published in 1924
 International Affairs (Soviet magazine), a communist propaganda vehicle

See also